The 2019–20 Peterborough United F.C. season was the club's 60th year in the Football League and their seventh consecutive season in the third tier, League One. Along with League One, the club also participated in the FA Cup, EFL Cup and EFL Trophy. The season covered the period from 1 July 2019 to 30 June 2020.

Squad

Statistics

|-
!colspan=15|Players out on loan:

|}

Goals record

Disciplinary record

Transfers

Transfers in

Loans in

Loans out

Transfers out

Pre-season
The Posh announced pre-season friendlies against St Mirren, Stamford, Kettering Town, Stevenage, Barnet Grimsby Town and Deeping Rangers.

Competitions

League One

League table

Results summary

Results by matchday

Matches
On Thursday, 20 June 2019, the EFL League One fixtures were revealed.

FA Cup

The first round draw was made on 21 October 2019. The second round draw was made live on 11 November from Chichester City's stadium, Oaklands Park. The third round draw was made live on BBC Two from Etihad Stadium, Micah Richards and Tony Adams conducted the draw.

EFL Cup

The first round draw was made on 20 June.

EFL Trophy

On 9 July 2019, the pre-determined group stage draw was announced with Invited clubs to be drawn on 12 July 2019. The draw for the second round was made on 16 November 2019 live on Sky Sports.

References

Peterborough United F.C. seasons
Peterborough United